Haiwei is the Pinyin romanisation of various Chinese given names (e.g. ; or ). These names are written with various Chinese characters, and may have differences in tone, so neither their pronunciation nor their meaning is identical. People with these names include:

Kaii Yoshida (born Song Haiwei 宋海伟, 1981), Chinese-born Japanese table tennis player 
Zhu Haiwei (朱海威; born 1991), Chinese footballer
Chen Haiwei (陈海威; born 1994), Chinese competitive foil fencer

See also
Hoi Wai (orca) (海威; 1975-1997), killer whale in Ocean Park Hong Kong (pinyin transliteration is Haiwei)

Chinese given names